was a Japanese film director, most famous for making tragi-comic films and satires.

Career
Kawashima was born in Mutsu, Aomori in the Shimokita Peninsula. From his youth, he suffered from a paralysis that affected his right leg and arm. He was educated at Meiji University, where he was a member of the film study circle. He entered the Shōchiku studios in 1938 and served as an assistant director under Minoru Shibuya and Keisuke Kinoshita before directing his first film, The Man Who Has Returned, in 1944. At Shōchiku after the war, he made many comedies before switching to Nikkatsu in 1955, when the studio resumed film production. There he made such notable works as Burden of Love (1955), Suzaki Paradise: Red Light District (1956), and Sun in the Last Days of the Shogunate (1957), which was later voted the fifth best Japanese film of all time in Kinema Junpō's poll of 140 film critics and filmmakers in 1999. In his remaining years, Kawashima worked at multiple studios—Daiei, Tokyo Eiga, and Toho— continuing to create satirical works like Temptation on Glamour Island (1959), Room for Let  (1959), and The Graceful Brute (1962), as well as literary adaptations like Women Are Born Twice (1961) and The Temple of Wild Geese (1962).

Like many Japanese directors of the period, Kawashima was very prolific, completing 51 films during a career that only lasted 19 years. He died suddenly in 1963 of cor pulmonale. His grave in Mutsu bears one of the lines from Kashima ari: "Saying goodbye is all life is" (Sayonara dake ga jinsei da).

Influence
He was a key influence on Shohei Imamura, who worked as his assistant director and referred to him as "my teacher." Imamura later remade Kawashima's 1957 film Sun in the Last Days of the Shogunate as Eijanaika.

Selected filmography 
 1944 The Man Who Has Returned (還って来た男)
 1948 The Follower (追跡者)
 1948 Oh Citizens! (市民諸君)
 1952 Tonkatsu taishō (とんかつ大将)
 1954 The Path of Sincerity (真実一路)
 1953 Ojōsan shachō (お嬢さん社長), lit. "Madame Company President"
 1954 Between Yesterday and Tomorrow (昨日と明日の間)
 1955 Burden of Love (愛のお荷物)
 1955 Till We Meet Again (あした来る人)
 1955 Tales of Ginza (銀座二十四帖)
 1956 The Balloon (風船)
 1956 Suzaki Paradise: Red Light (洲崎パラダイス 赤信号)
 1956 Our Town (わが町)
 1956 Hungry Soul (飢える魂)
 1956 Hungry Soul, Part II (続 飢える魂)
 1957 Sun in the Last Days of the Shogunate (幕末太陽傳, aka Bakumatsu taiyōden)
 1958 Woman Unveiled (女であること)
 1958 Noren (暖簾)
 1959 Temptation on Glamour Island (グラマ島の誘惑)
 1959 Room for Let (貸間あり)
 1960 The Flow of Evening (夜の流れ, aka The Lovelorn Geisha) (with Mikio Naruse)
 1960 Soft Touch of Night (赤坂の姉妹 夜の肌)
 1961 Romance Express (特急にっぽん)
 1961 Women Are Born Twice (女は二度生まれる, aka A Geisha’s Diary)
 1962 The Temple of the Wild Geese (雁の寺)
 1962 The Tale of the Blue Beka Boat (青べか物語)
 1962 The Graceful Brute (しとやかな獣, aka Elegant Beast)
 1962 Mount Hakone (箱根山)

References

External links

 

1918 births
1963 deaths
Japanese film directors
People from Mutsu, Aomori
Meiji University alumni